Glenea saperdoides is a species of beetle in the family Cerambycidae. It was described by James Thomson in 1860.

Subspecies
 Glenea saperdoides javicola Breuning, 1956
 Glenea saperdoides saperdoides J. Thomson, 1860
 Glenea saperdoides tamborana Breuning, 1956
 Glenea saperdoides vientianensis Pic, 1926

References

saperdoides
Beetles described in 1860